The Honour of Peverel (also known as the Feudal Barony of the Peak) is a geographic area in the north of England comprising part of the historic feudal barony held by the Norman Peverel family. The honour was granted to William Peverel (c. 1050 – c. 1115) by William the Conqueror.

The Honour is recorded in the Domesday Book of 1086, and consisted of substantial lands comprising 162 manors including:
Bolsover Castle - which became the seat of the Peverel family
Nottingham Castle
Codnor Castle
Pinxton
Duston
Peveril Castle in Castleton, Derbyshire
Glapwell
Eastwood, Nottinghamshire
Langar Hall

William Peverel's son, William Peverel the Younger, inherited the honour, but, accused of treason by King Henry II, forfeited it, and the king then passed it to  Ranulph de Gernon, 2nd Earl of Chester, who  died before he could take possession.

In literature 

The story of the Peverels formed the background to the historical novel Peveril of the Peak, by Sir Walter Scott, set in the 17th century, and published in 1823.

References 

Castles in Derbyshire
Honours (feudal barony)